HMS Hind was a member of the Gibraltar Group of 24-gun sixth rates. After commissioning she spent her career in Home Waters and the Baltic on trade protection duties. She was lost with all hands in a storm in the Bay of Biscay in March 1719.

Hind was the eighth vessel so named since the name was first used for a 28-gun vessel built in 1545 and sold in 1555.

Construction
She was ordered on 24 January 1711 from Woolwich Dockyard to be built under the guidance of Jacob Acworth, Master Shipwright of Woolwich. She was launched on 31 October 1711.

Commissioned Service
She was commissioned in 1712 under the command of Captain George Fairly, RN for service in Ireland. Captain Fairly was dismissed by quartmartial in December 1714. With Captain Fairly's dismissal, in December 1714 Captain Arthur Delgarno, RN took command and sailed in May for the Mediterranean. She took part in operations against the pirate vessels of Sale, Morocco during 1716 thru 1717. She returned to Home Waters to undergo a small repair at Portsmouth during June - July 1717 at a cost of £1,014.11.8d. In 1718 she was under the command of Captain William Collier, RN in the Channel Islands. in 1720 she was under Captain John Furzer, RN.

Loss
HMS Hind was Wrecked off Guernsey with loss of 24 sailors including her commander on 7 December 1721.

Notes

Citations

References
 Winfield 2009, British Warships in the Age of Sail (1603 – 1714), by Rif Winfield, published by Seaforth Publishing, England © 2009, EPUB , Chapter 6, The Sixth Rates, Vessels acquired from 2 May 1660, Gibraltar Group, Hind
 Winfield 2007, British Warships in the Age of Sail (1714 – 1792), by Rif Winfield, published by Seaforth Publishing, England © 2007, EPUB , Chapter 6, Sixth Rates, Sixth Rates of 20 or 24 guns, Vessels in Service at 1 August 1714, Gibraltar Group, Hind
 Colledge, Ships of the Royal Navy, by J.J. Colledge, revised and updated by Lt Cdr Ben Warlow and Steve Bush, published by Seaforth Publishing, Barnsley, Great Britain, © 2020, EPUB , (EPUB), Section H (Hind)

 

1710s ships
Corvettes of the Royal Navy
Ships built in Portsmouth
Naval ships of the United Kingdom